Torfinn Opheim (born 12 April 1961, in Sauda) is a Norwegian politician for the Labour Party.

He was elected to the Norwegian Parliament from Rogaland in 2005. He had previously served as a deputy representative during the term 2001–2005.

On the local level Opheim was a member of Sauda municipality council from 1987 to 2005, and he was mayor for the last six years of that period.

References

1961 births
Living people
Members of the Storting
Mayors of places in Rogaland
Labour Party (Norway) politicians
21st-century Norwegian politicians
People from Sauda